The Netherlands and its people have made numerous contributions to the world's civilization in art, science, technology and engineering, economics and finance, cartography and geography, exploration and navigation, law and jurisprudence, thought and philosophy, medicine and agriculture. The following list is composed of objects, ideas, phenomena, processes, methods, techniques and styles that were discovered or invented by people from the Netherlands and Dutch-speaking people from the former Southern Netherlands (Zuid-Nederlanders in Dutch). Until the fall of Antwerp (1585), the Dutch and Flemish were generally seen as one people.

Inventions and innovations

Arts and architecture

Movements and styles

De Stijl (Neo-Plasticism) (1917) 
The De Stijl school proposed simplicity and abstraction, both in architecture and painting, by using only straight horizontal and vertical lines and rectangular forms. Furthermore, their formal vocabulary was limited to the primary colours, red, yellow, and blue and the three primary values, black, white and grey. De Stijl's principal members were painters Theo van Doesburg (1883–1931), Piet Mondrian (1872–1944), Vilmos Huszár (1884–1960), and Bart van der Leck (1876–1958) and architects Gerrit Rietveld (1888–1964), Robert van 't Hoff (1888–1979) and J.J.P. Oud (1890–1963).

Architecture

Brabantine Gothic architecture (14th century) 
Brabantine Gothic, occasionally called Brabantian Gothic, is a significant variant of Gothic architecture that is typical for the Low Countries. It surfaced in the first half of the 14th century at Saint Rumbold's Cathedral in the City of Mechelen. The Brabantine Gothic style originated with the advent of the Duchy of Brabant and spread across the Burgundian Netherlands.

Netherlandish gabled architecture (15th–17th centuries) 

The Dutch gable was a notable feature of the Dutch-Flemish Renaissance architecture (or Northern Mannerist architecture) that spread to northern Europe from the Low Countries, arriving in Britain during the latter part of the 16th century. Notable castles/buildings including Frederiksborg Castle, Rosenborg Castle, Kronborg Castle, Børsen, Riga's House of the Blackheads and Gdańsk's Green Gate were built in Dutch-Flemish Renaissance style with sweeping gables, sandstone decorations and copper-covered roofs. Later Dutch gables with flowing curves became absorbed into Baroque architecture. Examples of Dutch-gabled buildings can be found in historic cities across Europe such as Potsdam (Dutch Quarter), Friedrichstadt, Gdańsk and Gothenburg. The style spread beyond Europe, for example Barbados is well known for Dutch gables on its historic buildings. Dutch settlers in South Africa brought with them building styles from the Netherlands: Dutch gables, then adjusted to the Western Cape region where the style became known as Cape Dutch architecture. In the Americas and Northern Europe, the West End Collegiate Church (New York City, 1892), the Chicago Varnish Company Building (Chicago, 1895), Pont Street Dutch-style buildings (London, 1800s), Helsingør Station (Helsingør, 1891), and Gdańsk University of Technology's Main Building (Gdańsk, 1904) are typical examples of the Dutch Renaissance Revival (Neo-Renaissance) architecture in the late 19th century.

Netherlandish Mannerist architecture (Antwerp Mannerism) (16th century) 
Antwerp Mannerism is the name given to the style of a largely anonymous group of painters from Antwerp in the beginning of the 16th century. The style bore no direct relation to Renaissance or Italian Mannerism, but the name suggests a peculiarity that was a reaction to the classic style of the early Netherlandish painting. Antwerp Mannerism may also be used to describe the style of architecture, which is loosely Mannerist, developed in Antwerp by about 1540, which was then influential all over Northern Europe. The Green Gate (Brama Zielona) in Gdańsk, Poland, is a building which is inspired by the Antwerp City Hall. It was built between 1568 and 1571 by Regnier van Amsterdam and Hans Kramer to serve as the formal residence of the Polish monarchs when visiting Gdańsk.

Cape Dutch architecture (1650s) 
Cape Dutch architecture is an architectural style found in the Western Cape of South Africa. The style was prominent in the early days (17th century) of the Cape Colony, and the name derives from the fact that the initial settlers of the Cape were primarily Dutch. The style has roots in medieval Netherlands, Germany, France and Indonesia. Houses in this style have a distinctive and recognisable design, with a prominent feature being the grand, ornately rounded gables, reminiscent of features in townhouses of Amsterdam built in the Dutch style.

Amsterdam School (Dutch Expressionist architecture) (1910s) 
The Amsterdam School (Dutch: Amsterdamse School) flourished from 1910 through about 1930 in the Netherlands. The Amsterdam School movement is part of international Expressionist architecture, sometimes linked to German Brick Expressionism.

Rietveld Schröder House (De Stijl architecture) (1924) 
The Rietveld Schröder House or Schröder House (Rietveld Schröderhuis in Dutch) in Utrecht was built in 1924 by Dutch architect Gerrit Rietveld. It became a listed monument in 1976 and a UNESCO World Heritage Site in 2000. The Rietveld Schröder House constitutes both inside and outside a radical break with tradition, offering little distinction between interior and exterior space. The rectilinear lines and planes flow from outside to inside, with the same colour palette and surfaces. Inside is a dynamic, changeable open zone rather than a static accumulation of rooms. The house is one of the best known examples of De Stijl architecture and arguably the only true De Stijl building.

Van Nelle Factory (1925–1931) 
The Van Nelle factory was built between 1925 and 1931. Its most striking feature is its huge glass façades. The factory was designed on the premise that a modern, transparent and healthy working environment in green surroundings would be good both for production and for workers' welfare. The Van Nelle Factory is a Dutch national monument (Rijksmonument) and since 2014 has the status of UNESCO World Heritage Site. The Justification of Outstanding Universal Value was presented in 2013 to the UNESCO World Heritage Committee.

Super Dutch (1990–present) 
An architectural movement started by a generation of new architects during the 1990, among this generation of architects were OMA, MVRDV, UNStudio, Mecanoo, Meyer en Van Schooten and many more. They started with buildings, which became internationally known for their new and refreshing style.

Furniture

Dutch door (17th century) 

The Dutch door (also known as stable door or half door) is a type of door divided horizontally in such a fashion that the bottom half may remain shut while the top half opens. The initial purpose of this door was to keep animals out of farmhouses, while keeping children inside, yet allowing light and air to filter through the open top. This type of door was common in the Netherlands in the seventeenth century and appears in Dutch paintings of the period. They were commonly found in Dutch areas of New York and New Jersey (before the American Revolution) and in South Africa.

Red and Blue Chair (1917) 

The Red and Blue Chair was designed in 1917 by Gerrit Rietveld. It represents one of the first explorations by the De Stijl art movement in three dimensions. It features several Rietveld joints.

Zig-Zag Chair (1934) 
The Zig-Zag Chair was designed by Rietveld in 1934. It is a minimalist design without legs, made by 4 flat wooden tiles that are merged in a Z-shape using Dovetail joints. It was designed for the Rietveld Schröder House in Utrecht.

Visual arts

Glaze (painting technique) (15th century) 
Glazing is a technique employed by painters since the invention of modern oil painting. Early Netherlandish painters in the 15th century were the first to make oil the usual painting medium, and explore the use of layers and glazes, followed by the rest of Northern Europe, and only then Italy.

Proto-Realism (15th–17th centuries) 
Two aspects of realism were rooted in at least two centuries of Dutch tradition: conspicuous textural imitation and a penchant for ordinary and exaggeratedly comic scenes. Two hundred years before the rise of literary realism, Dutch painters had already made an art of the everyday – pictures that served as a compelling model for the later novelists. By the mid-1800s, 17th-century Dutch painting figured virtually everywhere in the British and French fiction we esteem today as the vanguard of realism.

Proto-Surrealism (1470s–1510s) 
Hieronymus Bosch is considered one of the prime examples of Pre-Surrealism. The surrealists relied most on his insights. In the 20th century, Bosch's paintings (e.g. The Garden of Earthly Delights, The Haywain, The Temptation of St. Anthony and The Seven Deadly Sins and the Four Last Things) were cited by the Surrealists as precursors to their own visions.

Modern still-life painting (16th–17th century) 
Still-life painting as an independent genre or specialty first flourished in the Netherlands in the last quarter of the 16th century, and the English term derives from stilleven: still life, which is a calque, while Romance languages (as well as Greek, Polish, Russian and Turkish) tend to use terms meaning dead nature.

Naturalistic landscape painting (16th–17th century) 
The term "landscape" derives from the Dutch word landschap (and the German Landschaft), which originally meant "region, tract of land" but acquired the artistic connotation, "a picture depicting scenery on land" in the early 16th century. After the fall of the Roman Empire, the tradition of depicting pure landscapes declined and the landscape was seen only as a setting for religious and figural scenes. This tradition continued until the 16th century when artists began to view the landscape as a subject in its own right. The Dutch Golden Age painting of the 17th century saw the dramatic growth of landscape painting, in which many artists specialized, and the development of extremely subtle realist techniques for depicting light and weather.

Genre painting (15th century) 
The Flemish Renaissance painter Pieter Brueghel the Elder chose peasants and their activities as the subject of many paintings. Genre painting flourished in Northern Europe in his wake. Adriaen van Ostade, David Teniers, Aelbert Cuyp, Jan Steen, Johannes Vermeer and Pieter de Hooch were among many painters specializing in genre subjects in the Netherlands during the 17th century. The generally small scale of these artists' paintings was appropriate for their display in the homes of middle class purchasers.

Marine painting (17th century) 

Marine painting began in keeping with medieval Christian art tradition. Such works portrayed the sea only from a bird's eye view, and everything, even the waves, was organized and symmetrical. The viewpoint, symmetry and overall order of these early paintings underlined the organization of the heavenly cosmos from which the earth was viewed. Later Dutch artists such as Hendrick Cornelisz Vroom, Cornelius Claesz, Abraham Storck, Jan Porcellis, Simon de Vlieger, Willem van de Velde the Elder, Willem van de Velde the Younger and Ludolf Bakhuizen developed new methods for painting, often from a horizontal point of view, with a lower horizon and more focus on realism than symmetry.

Vanitas (17th century) 
The term vanitas is most often associated with still life paintings that were popular in seventeenth-century Dutch art, produced by the artists such as Pieter Claesz. Common vanitas symbols included skulls (a reminder of the certainty of death); rotten fruit (decay); bubbles, (brevity of life and suddenness of death); smoke, watches, and hourglasses, (the brevity of life); and musical instruments (the brevity and ephemeral nature of life). Fruit, flowers and butterflies can be interpreted in the same way, while a peeled lemon, as well as the typical accompanying seafood was, like life, visually attractive but with a bitter flavor.

Civil group portraiture (17th century) 
Group portraits were produced in great numbers during the Baroque period, particularly in the Netherlands. Unlike in the rest of Europe, Dutch artists received no commissions from the Calvinist Church which had forbidden such images or from the aristocracy which was virtually non-existent. Instead, commissions came from civic and businesses associations. Dutch painter Frans Hals used fluid brush strokes of vivid color to enliven his group portraits, including those of the civil guard to which he belonged. Rembrandt benefitted greatly from such commissions and from the general appreciation of art by bourgeois clients, who supported portraiture as well as still-life and landscape painting. Notably, the world's first significant art and dealer markets flourished in Holland at that time.

Tronie (17th century) 

In the 17th century, Dutch painters (especially Frans Hals, Rembrandt, Jan Lievens and Johannes Vermeer) began to create uncommissioned paintings called tronies that focused on the features and/or expressions of people who were not intended to be identifiable. They were conceived more for art's sake than to satisfy conventions. The tronie was a distinctive type of painting, combining elements of the portrait, history, and genre painting. This was usually a half-length of a single figure which concentrated on capturing an unusual mood or expression. The actual identity of the model was not supposed to be important, but they might represent a historical figure and be in exotic or historic costume. In contrast to portraits, "tronies" were painted for the open market. They differ from figurative paintings and religious figures in that they are not restricted to a moral or narrative context. It is, rather, much more an exploration of the spectrum of human physiognomy and expression and the reflection of conceptions of character that are intrinsic to psychology's pre-history.

Rembrandt lighting (17th century) 

Rembrandt lighting is a lighting technique that is used in studio portrait photography.
It can be achieved using one light and a reflector, or two lights, and is popular because
it is capable of producing images which appear both natural and compelling with a minimum
of equipment. Rembrandt lighting is characterized by an illuminated triangle under the eye
of the subject, on the less illuminated side of the face. It is named for the Dutch painter
Rembrandt, who often used this type of lighting in his portrait paintings.

Mezzotint (1642) 
The first known mezzotint was done in Amsterdam in 1642 by Utrecht-born German artist Ludwig von Siegen. He lived in Amsterdam from 1641 to about 1644, when he was supposedly influenced by Rembrandt.

Aquatint (1650s) 
The painter and printmaker Jan van de Velde is often credited to be the inventor of the aquatint technique, in Amsterdam around 1650.

Pronkstilleven (1650s) 
Pronkstilleven (pronk still life or ostentatious still life) is a type of banquet piece whose distinguishing feature is a quality of ostentation and splendor. These still lifes usually depict one or more especially precious objects. Although the term is a post-17th century invention, this type is characteristic of the second half of the seventeenth century. It was developed in the 1640s in Antwerp from where it spread quickly to the Dutch Republic. Flemish artists such as Frans Snyders and Adriaen van Utrecht started to paint still lifes that emphasized abundance by depicting a diversity of objects, fruits, flowers and dead game, often together with living people and animals. The style was soon adopted by artists from the Dutch Republic. A leading Dutch representative was Jan Davidsz. de Heem, who spent a long period of his active career in Antwerp and was one of the founders of the style in Holland.
 Other leading representatives in the Dutch Republic were Abraham van Beyeren, Willem Claeszoon Heda and Willem Kalf.

Proto-Expressionism (1880s) 
Vincent van Gogh's work is most often associated with Post-Impressionism, but his innovative style had a vast influence on 20th-century art and established what would later be known as Expressionism, also greatly influencing fauvism and early abstractionism. His impact on German and Austrian Expressionists was especially profound. "Van Gogh was father to us all," the German Expressionist painter Max Pechstein proclaimed in 1901, when Van Gogh's vibrant oils were first shown in Germany and triggered the artistic reformation, a decade after his suicide in obscurity in France. In his final letter to Theo, Van Gogh stated that, as he had no children, he viewed his paintings as his progeny. Reflecting on this, the British art historian Simon Schama concluded that he "did have a child of course, Expressionism, and many, many heirs."

M. C. Escher's graphic arts (1920s–1960s) 
Dutch graphic artist Maurits Cornelis Escher, usually referred to as M. C. Escher, is known for his often mathematically inspired woodcuts, lithographs, and mezzotints. These feature impossible constructions, explorations of infinity, architecture and tessellations. His special way of thinking and rich graphic work has had a continuous influence in science and art, as well as permeating popular culture. His ideas have been used in fields as diverse as psychology, philosophy, logic, crystallography and topology. His art is based on mathematical principles like tessellations, spherical geometry, the Möbius strip, unusual perspectives, visual paradoxes and illusions, different kinds of symmetries and impossible objects. Gödel, Escher, Bach by Douglas Hofstadter discusses the ideas of self-reference and strange loops, drawing on a wide range of artistic and scientific work, including Escher's art and the music of J. S. Bach, to illustrate ideas behind Gödel's incompleteness theorems.

Miffy (Nijntje) (1955) 
Miffy (Nijntje) is a small female rabbit in a series of picture books drawn and written by Dutch artist Dick Bruna.

Music

Franco-Flemish School (Netherlandish School) (15th–16th century) 

In music, the Franco-Flemish School or more precisely the Netherlandish school refers to the style of polyphonic vocal music composition in the Burgundian Netherlands in the 15th and early 16th centuries, and to the composers who wrote it.

Venetian School (Venetian polychoral style) (16th century) 
The Venetian School of polychoral music was founded by the Netherlandish composer Adrian Willaert.

Hardcore (electronic dance music genre) (1990s) 
Hardcore or hardcore techno is a subgenre of electronic dance music originating in Europe from the emergent raves in the 1990s. It was initially designed at Rotterdam in Netherlands, derived from techno.

Hardstyle (electronic dance music genre) (1990s–2000s) 
Hardstyle is an electronic dance genre mixing influences from hardtechno and hardcore. Hardstyle was influenced by gabber. Hardstyle has its origins in the Netherlands where artists like DJ Zany, Lady Dana, DJ Isaac, DJ Pavo, DJ Luna and The Prophet, who produced hardcore, started experimenting while playing their hardcore records.

Agriculture

Brussels sprout (13th century) 
Forerunners to modern Brussels sprouts were likely cultivated in ancient Rome. Brussels sprouts as we now know them were grown possibly as early as the 13th century in the Low Countries (may have originated in Brussels). The first written reference dates to 1587. During the 16th century, they enjoyed a popularity in the Southern Netherlands that eventually spread throughout the cooler parts of Northern Europe.

Orange-coloured carrot (16th century) 

Through history, carrots weren't always orange. They were black, purple, white, brown, red and yellow. Probably orange too, but this was not the dominant colour. Orange-coloured carrots appeared in the Netherlands in the 16th century. Dutch farmers in Hoorn bred the color. They succeeded by cross-breeding pale yellow with red carrots. It is more likely that Dutch horticulturists actually found an orange rooted mutant variety and then worked on its development through selective breeding to make the plant consistent. Through successive hybridisation the orange colour intensified. This was developed to become the dominant species across the world, a sweet orange.

Belle de Boskoop (apple) (1856) 
Belle de Boskoop is an apple cultivar which, as its name suggests, originated in Boskoop, where it began as a chance seedling in 1856. There are many variants: Boskoop red, yellow or green. This rustic apple is firm, tart and fragrant. Greenish-gray tinged with red, the apple stands up well to cooking. Generally Boskoop varieties are very high in acid content and can contain more than four times the vitamin C of 'Granny Smith' or 'Golden Delicious'.

Karmijn de Sonnaville (apple) (1949) 
Karmijn de Sonnaville is a variety of apple bred by Piet de Sonnaville, working in Wageningen in 1949. It is a cross of Cox's Orange Pippin and Jonathan, and was first grown commercially beginning in 1971. It is high both in sugars (including some sucrose) and acidity. It is a triploid, and hence needs good pollination, and can be difficult to grow. It also suffers from fruit russet, which can be severe. In Manhart's book, "apples for the 21st century", Karmijn de Sonnaville is tipped as a possible success for the future. Karmijn de Sonnaville is not widely grown in large quantities, but in Ireland, at The Apple Farm,  it is grown for fresh sale and juice-making, for which the variety is well suited.

Elstar (apple) (1950s) 
Elstar apple is an apple cultivar that was first developed in the Netherlands in the 1950s by crossing Golden Delicious and Ingrid Marie apples. It quickly became popular, especially in Europe and was first introduced to America in 1972. It remains popular in Continental Europe. The Elstar is a medium-sized apple whose skin is mostly red with yellow showing. The flesh is white, and has a soft, crispy texture. It may be used for cooking and is especially good for making apple sauce. In general, however, it is used in desserts due to its sweet flavour.

Groasis Waterboxx (2010) 
The Groasis Waterboxx is a device designed to help grow trees in dry areas. It was developed by former flower exporter Pieter Hoff, and won Popular Science's "Green Tech Best of What's New" Innovation of the year award for 2010.

Cartography and geography

Method for determining longitude using a clock (1530) 
The Dutch-Frisian geographer Gemma Frisius was the first to propose the use of a chronometer to determine longitude in 1530. In his book On the Principles of Astronomy and Cosmography (1530), Frisius explains for the first time how to use a very accurate clock to determine longitude. The problem was that in Frisius’ day, no clock was sufficiently precise to use his method. In 1761, the British clock-builder John Harrison constructed the first marine chronometer, which allowed the method developed by Frisius.

Triangulation and the systematic use of triangulation networks (1533 and 1615) 
Triangulation had first emerged as a map-making method in the mid-sixteenth century when the Dutch-Frisian mathematician Gemma Frisius set out the idea in his Libellus de locorum describendorum ratione (Booklet concerning a way of describing places). Dutch cartographer Jacob van Deventer was among the first to make systematic use of triangulation, the technique whose theory was described by Gemma Frisius in his 1533 book.

The modern systematic use of triangulation networks stems from the work of the Dutch mathematician Willebrord Snell (born Willebrord Snel van Royen), who in 1615 surveyed the distance from Alkmaar to Bergen op Zoom, approximately 70 miles (110 kilometres), using a chain of quadrangles containing 33 triangles in all – a feat celebrated in the title of his book Eratosthenes Batavus (The Dutch Eratosthenes), published in 1617.

Mercator projection (1569) 

The Mercator projection is a cylindrical map projection presented by the Flemish geographer and cartographer Gerardus Mercator in 1569. It became the standard map projection for nautical purposes because of its ability to represent lines of constant course, known as rhumb lines or loxodromes, as straight segments which conserve the angles with the meridians.

First modern world atlas (1570) 

Flemish geographer and cartographer Abraham Ortelius generally recognized as the creator of the world's first modern atlas, the Theatrum Orbis Terrarum (Theatre of the World). Ortelius's Theatrum Orbis Terrarum is considered the first true atlas in the modern sense: a collection of uniform map sheets and sustaining text bound to form a book for which copper printing plates were specifically engraved. It is sometimes referred to as the summary of sixteenth-century cartography.

First printed atlas of nautical charts (1584) 
The first printed atlas of nautical charts (De Spieghel der Zeevaerdt or The Mirror of Navigation / The Mariner's Mirror) was produced by Lucas Janszoon Waghenaer in Leiden. This atlas was the first attempt to systematically codify nautical maps. This chart-book combined an atlas of nautical charts and sailing directions with instructions for navigation on the western and north-western coastal waters of Europe. It was the first of its kind in the history of maritime cartography, and was an immediate success. The English translation of Waghenaer's work was published in 1588 and became so popular that any volume of sea charts soon became known as a "waggoner", the Anglicized form of Waghenaer's surname.

Concept of atlas (1595) 

Gerardus Mercator was the first to coin the word atlas to describe a bound collection of maps through his own collection entitled "Atlas sive Cosmographicae meditationes de fabrica mvndi et fabricati figvra". He coined this name after the Greek god who held The Sky up, later changed to holding up The Earth.

Charting of the far southern skies (southern constellations) (1595–97) 
The constellations around the South Pole were not observable from north of the equator, by Babylonians, Greeks, Chinese or Arabs. The modern constellations in this region were defined during the Age of Exploration, notably by Dutch navigators Pieter Dirkszoon Keyser and Frederick de Houtman at the end of sixteenth century. These twelve Dutch-created southern constellations represented flora and fauna of the East Indies and Madagascar. They were depicted by Johann Bayer in his star atlas Uranometria of 1603. Several more were created by Nicolas Louis de Lacaille in his star catalogue, published in 1756. By the end of the Ming dynasty, Xu Guangqi introduced 23 asterisms of the southern sky based on the knowledge of western star charts. These asterisms have since been incorporated into the traditional Chinese star maps. Among the IAU's 88 modern constellations, there are 15 Dutch-created constellations (including Apus, Camelopardalis, Chamaeleon, Columba, Dorado, Grus, Hydrus, Indus, Monoceros, Musca, Pavo, Phoenix, Triangulum Australe, Tucana and Volans).

Continental drift hypothesis (1596) 
The speculation that continents might have 'drifted' was first put forward by Abraham Ortelius in 1596. The concept was independently and more fully developed by Alfred Wegener in 1912. Because Wegener's publications were widely available in German and English and because he adduced geological support for the idea, he is credited by most geologists as the first to recognize the possibility of continental drift. During the 1960s geophysical and geological evidence for seafloor spreading at mid-oceanic ridges established continental drift as the standard theory or continental origin and an ongoing global mechanism.

Chemicals and materials

Bow dye (1630) 

While making a coloured liquid for a thermometer, Cornelis Drebbel dropped a flask of Aqua regia on a tin window sill, and discovered that stannous chloride makes the color of carmine much brighter and more durable. Though Drebbel himself never made much from his work, his daughters Anna and Catharina and his sons-in-law Abraham and Johannes Sibertus Kuffler set up a successful dye works. One was set up in 1643 in Bow, London, and the resulting color was called bow dye.

Dyneema (1979) 
Dutch chemical company DSM invented and patented the Dyneema in 1979. Dyneema fibres have been in commercial production since 1990 at their plant at Heerlen. These fibers are manufactured by means of a gel-spinning process that combines extreme strength with incredible softness. Dyneema fibres, based on ultra-high-molecular-weight polyethylene (UHMWPE), is used in many applications in markets such as life protection, shipping, fishing, offshore, sailing, medical and textiles.

Communication and multimedia

Compact cassette (1962) 

In 1962 Philips invented the compact audio cassette medium for audio storage, introducing it in Europe in August 1963 (at the Berlin Radio Show) and in the United States (under the Norelco brand) in November 1964, with the trademark name Compact Cassette.

Laserdisc (1969) 
Laserdisc technology, using a transparent disc, was invented by David Paul Gregg in 1958 (and patented in 1961 and 1990). By 1969, Philips developed a videodisc in reflective mode, which has great advantages over the transparent mode. MCA and Philips decided to join forces. They first publicly demonstrated the videodisc in 1972. Laserdisc entered the market in Atlanta, on 15 December 1978, two years after the VHS VCR and four years before the CD, which is based on Laserdisc technology. Philips produced the players and MCA made the discs.

Compact disc (1979) 

The compact disc was jointly developed by Philips (Joop Sinjou) and Sony (Toshitada Doi). In the early 1970s, Philips' researchers started experiments with "audio-only" optical discs, and at the end of the 1970s, Philips, Sony, and other companies presented prototypes of digital audio discs.

Bluetooth (1990s) 
Bluetooth, a low-energy, peer-to-peer wireless technology was originally developed by Dutch electrical engineer Jaap Haartsen and Swedish engineer Sven Mattisson in the 1990s, working at Ericsson in Lund, Sweden. It became a global standard of short distance wireless connection.

Wi-fi (1990s) 
In 1991, NCR Corporation/AT&T Corporation invented the precursor to 802.11 in Nieuwegein. Dutch electrical engineer Vic Hayes chaired IEEE 802.11 committee for 10 years, which was set up in 1990 to establish a wireless networking standard. He has been called the father of Wi-Fi (the brand name for products using IEEE 802.11 standards) for his work on IEEE 802.11 (802.11a & 802.11b) standard in 1997.

DVD (1995) 
The DVD optical disc storage format was invented and developed by Philips and Sony in 1995.

Ambilight (2002) 
Ambilight, short for "ambient lighting", is a lighting system for televisions developed by Philips in 2002.

Blu-ray (2006) 
Philips and Sony in 1997 and 2006 respectively, launched the Blu-ray video recording/playback standard.

Computer science and information technology

Dijkstra's algorithm (1956) 

Dijkstra's algorithm, conceived by Dutch computer scientist Edsger Dijkstra in 1956 and published in 1959, is a graph search algorithm that solves the single-source shortest path problem for a graph with non-negative edge path costs, producing a shortest path tree. Dijkstra's algorithm is so powerful that it not only finds the shortest path from a chosen source to a given destination, it finds all of the shortest paths from the source to all destinations. This algorithm is often used in routing and as a subroutine in other graph algorithms.

Dijkstra's algorithm is considered as one of the most popular algorithms in computer science. It is also widely used in the fields of artificial intelligence, operational research/operations research, network routing, network analysis, and transportation engineering.

Foundations of concurrent programming (1960s) 
The academic study of concurrent programming (concurrent algorithms in particular) started in the 1960s, with Edsger Dijkstra (1965) credited with being the first paper in this field, identifying and solving mutual exclusion. A pioneer in the field of concurrent computing, Per Brinch Hansen considers Dijkstra's Cooperating Sequential Processes (1965) to be the first classic paper in concurrent programming. As Brinch Hansen notes: ‘Here Dijkstra lays the conceptual foundation for abstract concurrent programming.’

Shunting-yard algorithm (1960) 
In computer science, the shunting-yard algorithm is a method for parsing mathematical expressions specified in infix notation. It can be used to produce output in Reverse Polish notation (RPN) or as an abstract syntax tree (AST). The algorithm was invented by Edsger Dijkstra and named the "shunting yard" algorithm because its operation resembles that of a railroad shunting yard. Dijkstra first described the Shunting Yard Algorithm in the Mathematisch Centrum report.

Schoonschip (early computer algebra system) (1963) 
In 1963/64, during an extended stay at SLAC, Dutch theoretical physicist Martinus Veltman designed the computer program Schoonschip for symbolic manipulation of mathematical equations, which is now considered the very first computer algebra system.

Mutual exclusion (mutex) (1965) 
In computer science, mutual exclusion refers to the requirement of ensuring that no two concurrent processes are in their critical section at the same time; it is a basic requirement in concurrency control, to prevent race conditions. The requirement of mutual exclusion was first identified and solved by Edsger W. Dijkstra in his seminal 1965 paper titled Solution of a problem in concurrent programming control, and is credited as the first topic in the study of concurrent algorithms.

Semaphore (programming) (1965) 
The semaphore concept was invented by Dijkstra in 1965 and the concept has found widespread use in a variety of operating systems.

Sleeping barber problem (1965) 
In computer science, the sleeping barber problem is a classic inter-process communication and synchronization problem between multiple operating system processes. The problem is analogous to that of keeping a barber working when there are customers, resting when there are none and doing so in an orderly manner. The sleeping barber problem was introduced by Edsger Dijkstra in 1965.

Banker's algorithm (deadlock prevention algorithm) (1965) 
The Banker's algorithm is a resource allocation and deadlock avoidance algorithm developed by Edsger Dijkstra that tests for safety by simulating the allocation of predetermined maximum possible amounts of all resources, and then makes an "s-state" check to test for possible deadlock conditions for all other pending activities, before deciding whether allocation should be allowed to continue. The algorithm was developed in the design process for the THE multiprogramming system and originally described (in Dutch) in EWD108. The name is by analogy with the way that bankers account for liquidity constraints.

Dining philosophers problem (1965) 
In computer science, the dining philosophers problem is an example problem often used in concurrent algorithm design to illustrate synchronization issues and techniques for resolving them. It was originally formulated in 1965 by Edsger Dijkstra as a student exam exercise, presented in terms of computers competing for access to tape drive peripherals.
Soon after, Tony Hoare gave the problem its present formulation.

Dekker's algorithm (1965) 
Dekker's algorithm is the first known correct solution to the mutual exclusion problem in concurrent programming. Dijkstra attributed the solution to Dutch mathematician Theodorus Dekker in his manuscript on cooperating sequential processes. It allows two threads to share a single-use resource without conflict, using only shared memory for communication. It is also the first published software-only, two-process mutual exclusion algorithm.

THE multiprogramming system (1968) 
The THE multiprogramming system was a computer operating system designed by a team led by Edsger W. Dijkstra, described in monographs in 1965–66 and published in 1968.

Van Wijngaarden grammar (1968) 
Van Wijngaarden grammar (also vW-grammar or W-grammar) is a two-level grammar that provides a technique to define potentially infinite context-free grammars in a finite number of rules. The formalism was invented by Adriaan van Wijngaarden to rigorously define some syntactic restrictions that previously had to be formulated in natural language, despite their formal content. Typical applications are the treatment of gender and number in natural language syntax and the well-definedness of identifiers in programming languages. The technique was used and developed in the definition of the programming language ALGOL 68. It is an example of the larger class of affix grammars.

Structured programming (1968) 
In 1968, computer programming was in a state of crisis. Dijkstra was one of a small group of academics and industrial programmers who advocated a new programming style to improve the quality of programs. Dijkstra coined the phrase "structured programming" and during the 1970s this became the new programming orthodoxy. Structured programming is often regarded as "goto-less programming".

EPROM (1971) 
An EPROM or erasable programmable read only memory, is a type of memory chip that retains its data when its power supply is switched off. Development of the EPROM memory cell started with investigation of faulty integrated circuits where the gate connections of transistors had broken. Stored charge on these isolated gates changed their properties. The EPROM was invented by the Amsterdam-born Israeli electrical engineer Dov Frohman in 1971, who was awarded US patent 3660819 in 1972.

Self-stabilization (1974) 
Self-stabilization is a concept of fault-tolerance in distributed computing. A distributed system that is self-stabilizing will end up in a correct state no matter what state it is initialized with. That correct state is reached after a finite number of execution steps.

Predicate transformer semantics (1975) 
Predicate transformer semantics were introduced by Dijkstra in his seminal paper "Guarded commands, nondeterminacy and formal derivation of programs".

Guarded Command Language (1975) 
The Guarded Command Language (GCL) is a language defined by Edsger Dijkstra for predicate transformer semantics. It combines programming concepts in a compact way, before the program is written in some practical programming language.

Van Emde Boas tree (VEB tree) (1975) 
A Van Emde Boas tree (or Van Emde Boas priority queue, also known as a vEB tree, is a tree data structure which implements an associative array with m-bit integer keys. The vEB tree was invented by a team led by Dutch computer scientist Peter van Emde Boas in 1975.

ABC (programming language) (1980s) 
ABC is an imperative general-purpose programming language and programming environment developed at CWI, Netherlands by Leo Geurts, Lambert Meertens, and Steven Pemberton. It is interactive, structured, high-level, and intended to be used instead of BASIC, Pascal, or AWK. It is not meant to be a systems-programming language but is intended for teaching or prototyping.

The language had a major influence on the design of the Python programming language (as a counterexample); Guido van Rossum, who developed Python, previously worked for several years on the ABC system in the early 1980s.

Dijkstra-Scholten algorithm (1980) 
The Dijkstra–Scholten algorithm (named after Edsger W. Dijkstra and Carel S. Scholten) is an algorithm for detecting termination in a distributed system. The algorithm was proposed by Dijkstra and Scholten in 1980.

Smoothsort (1981) 
Smoothsort is a comparison-based sorting algorithm. It is a variation of heapsort developed by Edsger Dijkstra in 1981. Like heapsort, smoothsort's upper bound is O(n log n). The advantage of smoothsort is that it comes closer to O(n) time if the input is already sorted to some degree, whereas heapsort averages O(n log n) regardless of the initial sorted state.

Amsterdam Compiler Kit (1983) 
The Amsterdam Compiler Kit (ACK) is a fast, lightweight and retargetable compiler suite and toolchain developed by Andrew Tanenbaum and Ceriel Jacobs at the Vrije Universiteit in Amsterdam. It is MINIX's native toolchain. The ACK was originally closed-source software (that allowed binaries to be distributed for MINIX as a special case), but in April 2003 it was released under an open-source BSD license. It has frontends for programming languages C, Pascal, Modula-2, Occam, and BASIC. The ACK's notability stems from the fact that in the early 1980s it was one of the first portable compilation systems designed to support multiple source languages and target platforms.

Eight-to-fourteen modulation (1985) 
EFM (Eight-to-Fourteen Modulation) was invented by Dutch electrical engineer Kees A. Schouhamer Immink in 1985. EFM is a data encoding technique – formally, a channel code – used by CDs, laserdiscs and pre-Hi-MD MiniDiscs.

MINIX (1987) 
MINIX (from "mini-Unix") is a Unix-like computer operating system based on a microkernel architecture. Early versions of MINIX were created by Andrew S. Tanenbaum for educational purposes. Starting with MINIX 3, the primary aim of development shifted from education to the creation of a highly reliable and self-healing microkernel OS. MINIX is now developed as open-source software. MINIX was first released in 1987, with its complete source code made available to universities for study in courses and research. It has been free and open-source software since it was re-licensed under the BSD license in April 2000. Tanenbaum created MINIX at the Vrije Universiteit in Amsterdam to exemplify the principles conveyed in his textbook, Operating Systems: Design and Implementation (1987), that Linus Torvalds described as "the book that launched me to new heights".

Amoeba (operating system) (1989) 
Amoeba is a distributed operating system developed by Andrew S. Tanenbaum and others at the Vrije Universiteit in Amsterdam. The aim of the Amoeba project was to build a timesharing system that makes an entire network of computers appear to the user as a single machine. The Python programming language was originally developed for this platform.

Python (programming language) (1989) 
Python is a widely used general-purpose, high-level programming language. Its design philosophy emphasizes code readability, and its syntax allows programmers to express concepts in fewer lines of code than would be possible in languages such as C++ or Java. The language provides constructs intended to enable clear programs on both a small and large scale. Python supports multiple programming paradigms, including object-oriented, imperative and functional programming or procedural styles. It features a dynamic type system and automatic memory management and has a large and comprehensive standard library.

Python was conceived in the late 1980s and its implementation was started in December 1989 by Guido van Rossum at CWI in the Netherlands as a successor to the ABC language (itself inspired by SETL) capable of exception handling and interfacing with the Amoeba operating system. Van Rossum is Python's principal author, and his continuing central role in deciding the direction of Python is reflected in the title given to him by the Python community, benevolent dictator for life (BDFL).

Vim (text editor) (1991) 
Vim is a text editor written by the Dutch free software programmer Bram Moolenaar and first released publicly in 1991. Based on the Vi editor common to Unix-like systems, Vim carefully separated the user interface from editing functions. This allowed it to be used both from a command line interface and as a standalone application in a graphical user interface.

Blender (1995) 

Blender is a professional free and open-source 3D computer graphics software product used for creating animated films, visual effects, art, 3D printed models, interactive 3D applications and video games. Blender's features include 3D modeling, UV unwrapping, texturing, raster graphics editing, rigging and skinning, fluid and smoke simulation, particle simulation, soft body simulation, sculpting, animating, match moving, camera tracking, rendering, video editing and compositing. Alongside the modelling features it also has an integrated game engine. Blender has been successfully used in the media industry in several parts of the world including Argentina, Australia, Belgium, Brazil, Russia, Sweden, and the United States.

The Dutch animation studio Neo Geo and Not a Number Technologies (NaN) developed Blender as an in-house application, with the primary author being Ton Roosendaal. The name Blender was inspired by a song by Yello, from the album Baby.

EFMPlus (1995) 
EFMPlus is the channel code used in DVDs and SACDs, a more efficient successor to EFM used in CDs. It was created by Dutch electrical engineer Kees A. Schouhamer Immink, who also designed EFM. It is 6% less efficient than Toshiba's SD code, which resulted in a capacity of 4.7 gigabytes instead of SD's original 5 GB. The advantage of EFMPlus is its superior resilience against disc damage such as scratches and fingerprints.

Economics

First megacorporation (1602) 

The Dutch East India Company was arguably the first megacorporation, possessing quasi-governmental powers, including the ability to wage war, imprison and execute convicts, negotiate treaties, coin money and establish colonies. Many economic and political historians consider the Dutch East India Company as the most valuable and powerful corporation in the world history.

The VOC existed for almost 200 years from its founding in 1602, when the States-General of the Netherlands granted it a 21-year monopoly over Dutch operations in Asia until its demise in 1796. During those two centuries (between 1602 and 1796), the VOC sent almost a million Europeans to work in the Asia trade on 4,785 ships, and netted for their efforts more than 2.5 million tons of Asian trade goods. By contrast, the rest of Europe combined sent only 882,412 people from 1500 to 1795, and the fleet of the English (later British) East India Company, the VOC's nearest competitor, was a distant second to its total traffic with 2,690 ships and a mere one-fifth the tonnage of goods carried by the VOC. The VOC enjoyed huge profits from its spice monopoly through most of the 17th century.

Dutch auction (17th century) 
A Dutch auction is also known as an open descending price auction. Named after the famous auctions of Dutch tulip bulbs in the 17th century, it is based on a pricing system devised by Nobel Prize–winning economist William Vickrey. In the traditional Dutch auction, the auctioneer begins with a high asking price which is lowered until some participant is willing to accept the auctioneer's price. The winning participant pays the last announced price. Dutch auction is also sometimes used to describe online auctions where several identical goods are sold simultaneously to an equal number of high bidders. In addition to cut flower sales in the Netherlands, Dutch auctions have also been used for perishable commodities such as fish and tobacco.

Concept of corporate governance (17th century) 
Isaac Le Maire, an Amsterdam businessman and a sizeable shareholder of the VOC, became the first recorded investor to actually consider the corporate governance's problems. In 1609, he complained of the VOC's shoddy corporate governance. On 24 January 1609, Le Maire filed a petition against the VOC, marking the first recorded expression of shareholder activism. In what is the first recorded corporate governance dispute, Le Maire formally charged that the directors (the VOC's board of directors – the Heeren XVII) sought to "retain another's money for longer or use it ways other than the latter wishes" and petitioned for the liquidation of the VOC in accordance with standard business practice.

The first shareholder revolt happened in 1622, among Dutch East India Company (VOC) investors who complained that the company account books had been "smeared with bacon" so that they might be "eaten by dogs." The investors demanded a "reeckeninge," a proper financial audit. The 1622 campaign by the shareholders of the VOC is a testimony of genesis of CSR (Corporate Social Responsibility) in which shareholders staged protests by distributing pamphlets and complaining about management self enrichment and secrecy.

Modern concept of foreign direct investment (17th century) 
The construction in 1619 of a train-oil factory on Smeerenburg in the Spitsbergen islands by the Noordsche Compagnie, and the acquisition in 1626 of Manhattan Island by the Dutch West India Company are referred to as the earliest cases of outward foreign direct investment (FDI) in Dutch and world history. Throughout the seventeenth century, the Dutch East India Company (VOC) and the Dutch West India Company (GWIC/WIC) also began to create trading settlements around the globe. Their trading activities generated enormous wealth, making the Dutch Republic one of the most prosperous countries of that time. The Dutch Republic's extensive arms trade occasioned an episode in the industrial development of early-modern Sweden, where arms merchants like Louis de Geer and the Trip brothers, invested in iron mines and iron works, another early example of outward foreign direct investment.

First capitalist nation-state (17th century) 

Some economic historians consider the Netherlands as the first predominantly capitalist nation. The development of European capitalism began among the city-states of Italy, Flanders, and the Baltic. It spread to the European interstate system, eventually resulting in the world's first capitalist nation-state, the Dutch Republic of the seventeenth century. The Dutch were the first to develop capitalism on a nationwide scale (as opposed to earlier city states).

First modern economic miracle (1585–1714) 
The Dutch economic transition from a possession of the Holy Roman Empire in the 1590s to the foremost maritime and economic power in the world has been called the "Dutch Miracle" (or "Dutch Tiger") by many economic historians, including K. W. Swart. During their Golden Age, the provinces of the Northern Netherlands rose from almost total obscurity as the poor cousins of the industrious and heavily urbanised southern regions (Southern Netherlands) to become the world leader in economic success. Its manufacturing towns grew so quickly that by the middle of the century the Netherlands had supplanted France as the leading industrial nation of the world.

Dynamic macroeconomic model (1936) 
Dutch economist Jan Tinbergen developed the first national comprehensive macroeconomic model, which he first built for the Netherlands and after World War II later applied to the United States and the United Kingdom.

Fairtrade certification (1988) 
The concept of fair trade has been around for over 40 years, but a formal labelling scheme emerged only in the 1980s. At the initiative of Mexican coffee farmers, the world's first Fairtrade labeling organisation, Stichting Max Havelaar, was launched in the Netherlands on 15 November 1988 by Nico Roozen, Frans van der Hoff and Dutch ecumenical development agency Solidaridad. It was branded "Max Havelaar" after a fictional Dutch character who opposed the exploitation of coffee pickers in Dutch colonies.

Finance

Concept of bourse (13th century) 

An exchange, or bourse, is a highly organized market where (especially) tradable securities, commodities, foreign exchange, futures, and options contracts are sold and bought. The term bourse is derived from the 13th-century inn named Huis ter Beurze in Bruges, Low Countries, where traders and foreign merchants from across Europe conducted business in the late medieval period. The building, which was established by Robert van der Buerze as a hostelry, had operated from 1285. Its managers became famous for offering judicious financial advice to the traders and merchants who frequented the building. This service became known as the "Beurze Purse" which is the basis of bourse, meaning an organised place of exchange.

Foundations of stock market (1602) 

The seventeenth-century Dutch merchants laid the foundations for modern stock market. The Dutch merchants were also the pioneers in developing the basic techniques of stock trading. Although bond sales by municipalities and states can be traced to the thirteenth century, the origin of modern stock exchanges that specialize in creating and sustaining secondary markets in corporate securities goes back to the formation of the Dutch East India Company in the year 1602.

Foundations of corporate finance (17th century) 
What is now known as corporate finance has its modern roots in financial management policies of the Dutch East India Company (VOC) in the 17th century and some basic aspects of modern corporate finance began to appear in financial activities of Dutch businessmen in the early 17th century.

Foundations of investment banking (17th century) 
The Dutch were the pioneers in laying the basis for investment banking, allowing the risk of loans to be distributed among thousands of investors in the early seventeenth century.

Foundations of central banking (1609) 

Prior to the 17th century most money was commodity money, typically gold or silver. However, promises to pay were widely circulated and accepted as value at least five hundred years earlier in both Europe and Asia. The Song dynasty was the first to issue generally circulating paper currency, while the Yuan dynasty was the first to use notes as the predominant circulating medium. In 1455, in an effort to control inflation, the succeeding Ming dynasty ended the use of paper money and closed much of Chinese trade. The medieval European Knights Templar ran an early prototype of a central banking system, as their promises to pay were widely respected, and many regard their activities as having laid the basis for the modern banking system. The Bank of Amsterdam (Amsterdamsche Wisselbank or literally Amsterdam Exchange Bank) established in 1609 is considered to be the precursor to modern central banks, if not the first true central bank.

Short selling (1609) 
Financial innovation in Amsterdam took many forms. In 1609, investors led by Isaac Le Maire formed history's first bear syndicate to engage in short selling, but their coordinated trading had only a modest impact in driving down share prices, which tended to be robust throughout the 17th century.

Concept of dividend policy (1610) 
In the first decades of the 17th century, the VOC was the first recorded company ever to pay regular dividends. To encourage investors to buy shares, a promise of an annual payment (called a dividend) was made. An investor would receive dividends instead of interest and the investment was permanent in the form of shares in the company. Between 1600 and 1800 the Dutch East India Company (VOC) paid annual dividends worth around 18 percent of the value of the shares.

First European banknote (1661) 
In 1656, King Charles X Gustav of Sweden signed two charters creating two private banks under the directorship of Johan Palmstruch (though before having been ennobled he was called Johan Wittmacher or Hans Wittmacher), a Riga-born merchant of Dutch origin. Palmstruch modeled the banks on those of Amsterdam where he had become a burgher. The first real European banknote was issued in 1661 by the Stockholms Banco of Johan Palmstruch, a private bank under state charter (precursor to the Sveriges Riksbank, the central bank of Sweden).

First book on stock trading (1688) 
Joseph de la Vega, also known as Joseph Penso de la Vega, was an Amsterdam trader from a Spanish Jewish family and a prolific writer as well as a successful businessman. His 1688 book Confusion de Confusiones (Confusion of Confusions) explained the workings of the city's stock market. It was the earliest book about stock trading, taking the form of a dialogue between a merchant, a shareholder and a philosopher. The book described a market that was sophisticated but also prone to excesses, and de la Vega offered advice to his readers on such topics as the unpredictability of market shifts and the importance of patience in investment.

Concept of technical analysis (1688) 
The principles of technical analysis are derived from hundreds of years of financial market data. These principles in a raw form have been studied since the seventeenth century. Some aspects of technical analysis began to appear in Joseph de la Vega's accounts of the Dutch markets in the late 17th century. In Asia, technical analysis is said to be a method developed by Homma Munehisa during the early 18th century which evolved into the use of candlestick techniques, and is today a technical analysis charting tool.

Concept of behavioral finance (1688) 
Josseph de la Vega was in 1688 the first person to give an account of irrational behaviour in financial markets. His 1688 book Confusion of Confusions, has been described as the first precursor of modern behavioural finance, with its descriptions of investor decision-making still reflected in the way some investors operate today.

Concept of investment fund (1774) 
The first investment fund has its roots back in 1774. A Dutch merchant named Adriaan van Ketwich formed a trust named Eendragt Maakt Magt. The name of Ketwich's fund translates to "unity creates strength". In response to the financial crisis of 1772–1773, Ketwich's aim was to provide small investors an opportunity to diversify (Rouwenhorst & Goetzman, 2005). This investment scheme can be seen as the first near-mutual fund. In the years following, near-mutual funds evolved and become more diverse and complex.

Mutual fund (1774) 
The first mutual funds were established in 1774 in the Netherlands. Amsterdam-based businessman Abraham van Ketwich (a.k.a. Adriaan van Ketwich) is often credited as the originator of the world's first mutual fund. The first mutual fund outside the Netherlands was the Foreign & Colonial Government Trust, which was established in London in 1868.

Foods and drinks

Gibbing (14th century) 

Gibbing is the process of preparing salt herring (or soused herring), in which the gills and part of the gullet are removed from the fish, eliminating any bitter taste. The liver and pancreas are left in the fish during the salt-curing process because they release enzymes essential for flavor. The fish is then cured in a barrel with one part salt to 20 herring. Today many variations and local preferences exist on this process. The process of gibbing was invented by Willem Beuckelszoon (aka Willem Beuckelsz, William Buckels or William Buckelsson), a 14th-century Zealand Fisherman. The invention of this fish preservation technique led to the Dutch becoming a seafaring power. This invention created an export industry for salt herring that was monopolized by the Dutch.

Doughnut (17th century) 
Some people believe it was the Dutch who invented doughnuts. A Dutch snack made from potatoes had a round shape like a ball, but, like Gregory's dough balls, needed a little longer time when fried to cook the inside thoroughly. These potato-balls developed into doughnuts when the Dutch finally made them into ring-shapes reduce frying time.

Gin (jenever) (1650) 

Gin is a spirit which derives its predominant flavour from juniper berries (Juniperus communis). From its earliest origins in the Middle Ages, gin has evolved over the course of a millennium from a herbal medicine to an object of commerce in the spirits industry. Gin was developed on the basis of the older Jenever, and become widely popular in Great Britain when William III of Orange, leader of the Dutch Republic, occupied the British throne with his wife Mary. Today, the gin category is one of the most popular and widely distributed range of spirits, and is represented by products of various origins, styles, and flavour profiles that all revolve around juniper as a common ingredient.

The Dutch physician Franciscus Sylvius is often credited with the invention of gin in the mid-17th century, although the existence of genever is confirmed in Massinger's play The Duke of Milan (1623), when Dr. Sylvius would have been but nine years of age. It is further claimed that British soldiers who provided support in Antwerp against the Spanish in 1585, during the Eighty Years' War, were already drinking genever (jenever) for its calming effects before battle, from which the term Dutch Courage is believed to have originated. The earliest known written reference to genever appears in the 13th century encyclopaedic work Der Naturen Bloeme (Bruges), and the earliest printed genever recipe from 16th century work Een Constelijck Distileerboec (Antwerp).

Stroopwafel (1780s) 
A stroopwafel (also known as syrup waffle, treacle waffle or caramel waffle) is a waffle made from two thin layers of baked batter with a caramel-like syrup filling the middle. They were first made in Gouda in the 1780s. The traditional way to eat the stroopwafel is to place it atop of a drinking vessel with a hot beverage (coffee, tea or chocolate) inside that fits the diameter of the waffle. The heat from the rising steam warms the waffle and slightly softens the inside and makes the waffle soft on one side while still crispy on the other.

Cocoa powder (1828) 
In 1815, Dutch chemist Coenraad van Houten introduced alkaline salts to chocolate, which reduced its bitterness. In the 1820s, Casparus van Houten, Sr. patented an inexpensive method for pressing the fat from roasted cocoa beans. He created a press to remove about half the natural fat (cacao butter) from chocolate liquor, which made chocolate both cheaper to produce and more consistent in quality.

Dutch-process chocolate (1828) 
Dutch-processed chocolate or Dutched chocolate is chocolate that has been treated with an alkalizing agent to modify its color and give it a milder taste compared to "natural cocoa" extracted with the Broma process. It forms the basis for much of modern chocolate, and is used in ice cream, hot cocoa, and baking. The Dutch process was developed in the early 19th century by Dutch chocolate maker Coenraad Johannes van Houten, whose father Casparus is responsible for the development of the method of removing fat from cacao beans by hydraulic press around 1828, forming the basis for cocoa powder.

Law and jurisprudence

Doctrine of the Freedom of the Seas (foundations of the Law of the Sea/UNCLOS) (1609) 

In 1609, Hugo Grotius, the Dutch jurist who is generally known as the father of modern international law, published his book Mare Liberum (The Free Sea), which first formulated the notion of freedom of the seas. He developed this idea into a legal principle. It is said to be 'the first, and classic, exposition of the doctrine of the freedom of the seas' which has been the essence and backbone of the modern law of the sea. It is generally assumed that Grotius first propounded the principle of freedom of the seas, although all countries in the Indian Ocean and other Asian seas accepted the right of unobstructed navigation long before Grotius wrote his De Jure Praedae (On the Law of Spoils) in the year of 1604. His work sparked a debate in the seventeenth century over whether states could exclude the vessels of other states from certain waters. Grotius won this debate, as freedom of the seas became a universally recognized legal principle, associated with concepts such as communication, trade and peace. Grotius's notion of the freedom of the seas would persist until the mid-twentieth century, and it continues to be applied even to this day for much of the high seas, though the application of the concept and the scope of its reach is changing.

Secularized natural law (foundations of modern international law) (1625) 
The publication of De jure belli ac pacis (On the Laws of War and Peace) by Hugo Grotius in 1625 had marked the emergence of international law as an 'autonomous legal science'. Grotius's On the Law of War and Peace, published in 1625, is best known as the first systematic treatise on international law, but to thinkers of the seventeenth and eighteenth centuries, it seemed to set a new agenda in moral and political philosophy across the board. Grotius developed pivotal treatises on freedom of the seas, the law of spoils, the laws of war and peace and he created an autonomous place for international law as its own discipline. Jean Barbeyrac's Historical and Critical Account of the Science of Morality, attached to his translation of Samuel von Pufendorf's Law of Nature and Nations in 1706, praised Grotius as "the first who broke the ice" of "the Scholastic Philosophy; which [had] spread itself all over Europe" (1749: 67, 66). Grotius' truly distinctive contribution to jurisprudence and philosophy of law (public international law or law of nations in particular) was that he secularized natural law. Grotius had divorced natural law from theology and religion by grounding it solely in the social nature and natural reason of man. When Grotius, considered by many to be the founder of modern natural law theory (or secular natural law), said that natural law would retain its validity 'even if God did not exist' (etiamsi daremus non-esse Deum), he was making a clear break with the classical tradition of natural law.

Cannon shot rule (1702) 
By the end of the seventeenth century, support was growing for some limitation to the seaward extent of territorial waters. What emerged was the so-called "cannon shot rule", which acknowledged the idea that property rights could be acquired by physical occupation and in practice to the effective range of shore-based cannon: about three nautical miles. The rule was long associated with Cornelis van Bijnkershoek, a Dutch jurist who, especially in his De Dominio Maris Dissertatio (1702), advocated a middle ground between the extremes of Mare Liberum and John Selden's Mare Clausum, accepting both the freedom of states to navigate and exploit the resources of the high seas and a right of coastal states to assert wide-ranging rights in a limited marine territory.

Permanent Court of Arbitration (1899) 
The Permanent Court of Arbitration (PCA) is an international organization based in The Hague in the Netherlands. The court was established in 1899 as one of the acts of the first Hague Peace Conference, which makes it the oldest global institution for international dispute resolution. Its creation is set out under Articles 20 to 29 of the 1899 Hague Convention for the pacific settlement of international disputes, which was a result of the first Hague Peace Conference. The most concrete achievement of the Conference was the establishment of the PCA as the first institutionalized global mechanism for the settlement of disputes between states. The PCA encourages the resolution of disputes that involve states, state entities, intergovernmental organizations, and private parties by assisting in the establishment of arbitration tribunals and facilitating their work. The court offers a wide range of services for the resolution of international disputes which the parties concerned have expressly agreed to submit for resolution under its auspices. Dutch-Jew legal scholar Tobias Asser's role in the creation of the PCA at the first Hague Peace Conference (1899) earned him the Nobel Peace Prize in 1911.

International Opium Convention (1912) 
The International Opium Convention, sometimes referred to as the Hague Convention of 1912, signed on 23 January 1912 at The Hague, was the first international drug control treaty and is the core of the international drug control system. The adoption of the convention was a turning point in multilateralism, based on the recognition of the transnational nature of the drug problem and the principle of shared responsibility.

Marriage equality (legalization of same-sex marriage) (2001) 
Denmark was the first state to recognize a legal relationship for same-sex couples, establishing "registered partnerships" very much like marriage in 1989. In 2001, the Netherlands became the first nation in the world to grant same-sex marriages. The first laws enabling same-sex marriage in modern times were enacted during the first decade of the 21st century. , sixteen countries (Argentina, Belgium, Brazil, Canada, Denmark, France, Iceland, Netherlands, New Zealand, Norway, Portugal, Spain, South Africa, Sweden, United Kingdom, Uruguay) and several sub-national jurisdictions (parts of Mexico and the United States) allow same-sex couples to marry. Polls in various countries show that there is rising support for legally recognizing same-sex marriage across race, ethnicity, age, religion, political affiliation, and socioeconomic status.

Measurement

Pendulum clock (first high-precision clock) (1656) 

The first mechanical clocks, employing the verge escapement mechanism with a foliot or balance wheel timekeeper, were invented in Europe at around the start of the 14th century, and became the standard timekeeping device until the pendulum clock was invented in 1656. The pendulum clock remained the most accurate timekeeper until the 1930s, when quartz oscillators were invented, followed by atomic clocks after World War 2.

A pendulum clock uses a pendulum's arc to mark intervals of time. From their invention until about 1930, the most accurate clocks were pendulum clocks. Pendulum clocks cannot operate on vehicles or ships at sea, because the accelerations disrupt the pendulum's motion, causing inaccuracies. The pendulum clock was invented by Christiaan Huygens, based on the pendulum introduced by Galileo Galilei. Although Galileo studied the pendulum as early as 1582, he never actually constructed a clock based on that design. Christiaan Huygens invented pendulum clock in 1656 and patented the following year. He contracted the construction of his clock designs to clockmaker Salomon Coster, who actually built the clock.

Concept of the standardization of the temperature scale (1665) 
Various authors have credited the invention of the thermometer to Cornelis Drebbel, Robert Fludd, Galileo Galilei or Santorio Santorio. The thermometer was not a single invention, however, but a development. However, each inventor and each thermometer was unique – there was no standard scale. In 1665 Christiaan Huygens suggested using the melting and boiling points of water as standards. The Fahrenheit scale is now usually defined by two fixed points: the temperature at which water freezes into ice is defined as 32 degrees Fahrenheit (°F), and the boiling point of water is defined to be , a 180-degree separation, as defined at sea level and standard atmospheric pressure. In 1742, Swedish astronomer Anders Celsius created a temperature scale which was the reverse of the scale now known by the name "Celsius": 0 represented the boiling point of water, while 100 represented the freezing point of water. From 1744 until 1954, 0 °C was defined as the freezing point of water and 100 °C was defined as the boiling point of water, both at a pressure of one standard atmosphere with mercury being the working material.

Spiral-hairspring watch (1675) 

The invention of the mainspring in the early 15th century allowed portable clocks to be built, evolving into the first pocketwatches by the 17th century, but these were not very accurate until the balance spring was added to the balance wheel in the mid-17th century. Some dispute remains as to whether British scientist Robert Hooke (his was a straight spring) or Dutch scientist Christiaan Huygens was the actual inventor of the balance spring. This innovation increased watches' accuracy enormously, reducing error from perhaps several hours per day to perhaps 10 minutes per day, resulting in the addition of the minute hand to the face from around 1680 in Britain and 1700 in France.

Mercury thermometer (1714) 

Various authors have credited the invention of the thermometer to Cornelis Drebbel, Robert Fludd, Galileo Galilei or Santorio Santorio. The thermometer was not a single invention, however, but a development. Though Galileo is often said to be the inventor of the thermometer, what he produced were thermoscopes. The difference between a thermoscope and a thermometer is that the latter has a scale. The first person to put a scale on a thermoscope is variously said to be Francesco Sagredo or Santorio Santorio in about 1611 to 1613. Daniel Gabriel Fahrenheit began constructing his own thermometers in 1714, and it was in these that he used mercury for the first time.

Fahrenheit scale (1724) 

Various authors have credited the invention of the thermometer to Cornelis Drebbel, Robert Fludd, Galileo Galilei or Santorio Santorio. The thermometer was not a single invention, however, but a development. However, each inventor and each thermometer was unique – there was no standard scale. In 1665 Christiaan Huygens suggested using the melting and boiling points of water as standards, and in 1694 Carlo Renaldini proposed using them as fixed points on a universal scale. In 1701 Isaac Newton proposed a scale of 12 degrees between the melting point of ice and body temperature. Finally in 1724 Daniel Gabriel Fahrenheit produced a temperature scale which now (slightly adjusted) bears his name. He could do this because he manufactured thermometers, using mercury (which has a high coefficient of expansion) for the first time and the quality of his production could provide a finer scale and greater reproducibility, leading to its general adoption. By the end of the 20th century, most countries used the Celsius scale rather than the Fahrenheit scale, though Canada retained it as a supplementary scale used alongside Celsius. Fahrenheit remains the official scale for Jamaica, the Cayman Islands, Belize, the Bahamas, Palau and the United States and associated territories.

Snellen chart (1862) 
The Snellen chart is an eye chart used by eye care professionals and others to measure visual acuity. Snellen charts are named after Dutch ophthalmologist Hermann Snellen who developed the chart in 1862. Vision scientists now use a variation of this chart, designed by Ian Bailey and Jan Lovie.

String galvanometer (1902) 
Previous to the string galvanometer, scientists used a machine called the capillary electrometer to measure the heart's electrical activity, but this device was unable to produce results at a diagnostic level. Dutch physiologist Willem Einthoven developed the string galvanometer in the early 20th century, publishing the first registration of its use to record an electrocardiogram in a Festschrift book in 1902. The first human electrocardiogram was recorded in 1887, however only in 1901 was a quantifiable result obtained from the string galvanometer.

Schilt photometer (1922) 
In 1922, Dutch astronomer Jan Schilt invented the Schilt photometer, a device that measures the light output of stars and, indirectly, their distances.

Medicine

Clinical electrocardiography (first diagnostic electrocardiogram) (1902) 

In the 19th century it became clear that the heart generated electric currents. The first to systematically approach the heart from an electrical point-of-view was Augustus Waller, working in St Mary's Hospital in Paddington, London. In 1911 he saw little clinical application for his work. The breakthrough came when Willem Einthoven, working in Leiden, used his more sensitive string galvanometer, than the capillary electrometer that Waller used. Einthoven assigned the letters P, Q, R, S and T to the various deflections that it measured and described the electrocardiographic features of a number of cardiovascular disorders. He was awarded the 1924 Nobel Prize for Physiology or Medicine for his discovery.

Einthoven's triangle (1902) 
Einthoven's triangle is an imaginary formation of three limb leads in a triangle used in electrocardiography, formed by the two shoulders and the pubis. The shape forms an inverted equilateral triangle with the heart at the center that produces zero potential when the voltages are summed. It is named after Willem Einthoven, who theorized its existence.

First European blood bank (1940) 
When German bombers attacked The Hague in 1940 while Willem Johan Kolff was there, he organised the first blood bank in continental Europe. It was located in the Zuidwal hospital in The Hague. Eleven patients were given blood transfusions in The Hague, six of whom survived. Donated blood was also used for victims of the bombardment of Rotterdam, whither it was transported by civilian car.

Rotating drum dialysis machine (first practical artificial kidney) (1943) 

An artificial kidney is a machine and its related devices which clean blood for patients who have an acute or chronic failure of their kidneys. The first artificial kidney was developed by Dutchman Willem Johan Kolff. The procedure of cleaning the blood by this means is called dialysis, a type of renal replacement therapy that is used to provide an artificial replacement for lost kidney function due to renal failure. It is a life support treatment and does not treat disease.

Artificial heart (1957) 
On 12 December 1957, Kolff implanted an artificial heart into a dog at Cleveland Clinic. The dog lived for 90 minutes. In 1967, Dr. Kolff left Cleveland Clinic to start the Division of Artificial Organs at the University of Utah and pursue his work on the artificial heart. Under his supervision, a team of surgeons, chemists, physicists and bioengineers developed an artificial heart and made it ready for industrial production. To help manage his many endeavors, Dr. Kolff assigned project managers. Each project was named after its manager. Graduate student Robert Jarvik was the project manager for the artificial heart, which was subsequently renamed the Jarvik-7. Based on lengthy animal trials, this first artificial heart was successfully implanted into the thorax of patient Barney Clark in December 1982. Clark survived 112 days with the device.

Military

Norden bombsight (1920s) 
The Norden bombsight was designed by Carl Norden, a Dutch engineer educated in Switzerland who emigrated to the U.S. in 1904. In 1920, he started work on the Norden bombsight for the United States Navy. The first bombsight was produced in 1927. It was essentially an analog computer, and bombardiers were trained in great secrecy on how to use it. The device was used to drop bombs accurately from an aircraft, supposedly accurate enough to hit a 100-foot circle from an altitude of 21,000 feet – but under actual combat situations, such an accuracy was never achieved.

Submarine snorkel (1939) 
A submarine snorkel is a device that allows a submarine to operate submerged while still taking in air from above the surface. It was invented by the Dutchman J.J. Wichers shortly before World War II and copied by the Germans during the war for use by U-boats. Its common military name is snort.

Goalkeeper CIWS (1975) 
Goalkeeper is a close-in weapon system (CIWS) still in use as of 2015. It is autonomous and completely automatic short-range defense of ships against highly maneuverable missiles, aircraft and fast maneuvering surface vessels. Once activated the system automatically performs the entire process from surveillance and detection to destruction, including selection of priority targets.

Musical instruments

Metronome (1812) 

The first (mechanical) metronome was invented by Dietrich Nikolaus Winkel in Amsterdam in 1812, but named (patented) after Johann Maelzel, who took the idea and popularized it.

Fokker organ (1950) 
Dutch musician-physicist Adriaan Fokker designed and had built keyboard instruments capable of playing microtonal scales via a generalized keyboard. The best-known of these is his 31-tone equal-tempered organ, which was installed in Teylers Museum in Haarlem in 1951. It is commonly called the Fokker organ.

Kraakdoos (1960s) 
The Kraakdoos or Cracklebox is a custom-made battery-powered noise-making electronic device. It is a small box with six metal contacts on top, which when pressed by fingers generates unusual sounds and tones. The human body becomes a part of the circuit and determines the range of sounds possible – different players generate different results. The concept was first conceived by Michel Waisvisz and Geert Hamelberg in the 1960s, and developed further in the 1970s when Waisvisz joined the STEIM foundation in Amsterdam.

Moodswinger (2006) 
The Moodswinger is a twelve-string electric zither with an additional third bridge designed by Dutch luthier Yuri Landman. The rod functions as the third bridge and divides the strings into two sections to add overtones, creating a multiphonic sound.

Springtime (guitar) (2008) 
The Springtime is an experimental electric guitar with seven strings and three outputs. Landman created the instrument in 2008.

Philosophy and social sciences

Neostoicism (1580s) 

Neostoicism was a syncretic philosophical movement, joining Stoicism and Christianity. Neostoicism was founded by Dutch-Flemish humanist Justus Lipsius, who in 1584 presented its rules, expounded in his book De Constantia (On Constancy), as a dialogue between Lipsius and his friend Charles de Langhe. The eleven years (1579–1590) that Lipsius spent in Leiden (Leiden University) were the period of his greatest productivity. It was during this time that he wrote a series of works designed to revive ancient Stoicism in a form that would be compatible with Christianity. The most famous of these is De Constantia (1584). Neostoicism had an influence on many seventeenth and eighteenth-century writers including Montesquieu, Bossuet, Francis Bacon, Joseph Hall, Francisco de Quevedo and Juan de Vera y Figueroa.

Modern pantheism (1670s) 
Pantheism was popularized in the modern era as both a theology and philosophy based on the work of the 17th-century Dutch Jew philosopher Baruch Spinoza, whose Ethics was an answer to Descartes' famous dualist theory that the body and spirit are separate. Spinoza is regarded as the chief source of modern pantheism. Spinoza held that the two are the same, and this monism is a fundamental quality of his philosophy. He was described as a "God-intoxicated man," and used the word God to describe the unity of all substance. Although the term pantheism was not coined until after his death, Spinoza is regarded as its most celebrated advocate.

Spinozism (1660s–1670s) 
Spinozism is the monist philosophical system of the Dutch-Jewish philosopher Baruch Spinoza which defines "God" as a singular self-subsistent substance, with both matter and thought as its attributes.

Affect (philosophy) (1670s) 
Affect (affectus or adfectus in Latin) is a concept used in the philosophy of Spinoza and elaborated by Henri Bergson, Gilles Deleuze and Félix Guattari that emphasizes bodily experience. The term "affect" is central to what became known as the "affective turn" in the humanities and social sciences.

Mandeville's paradox (1714) 
Mandeville's paradox is named after Bernard Mandeville, who shows that actions which may be qualified as vicious with regard to individuals have benefits for society as a whole. This is already clear from the subtitle of his most famous work, The Fable of The Bees: ‘Private Vices, Publick Benefits’. He states that "Fraud, Luxury, and Pride must live; Whilst we the Benefits receive.") (The Fable of the Bees, ‘The Moral’).

Mathematical intuitionism (1907–1908) 
Mathematical intuitionism was founded by the Dutch mathematician and philosopher Luitzen Egbertus Jan Brouwer. In the philosophy of mathematics, intuitionism, or neointuitionism (opposed to preintuitionism), is an approach where mathematics is considered to be purely the result of the constructive mental activity of humans rather than the discovery of fundamental principles claimed to exist in an objective reality. That is, logic and mathematics are not considered analytic activities wherein deep properties of objective reality are revealed and applied, but are instead considered the application of internally consistent methods used to realize more complex mental constructs, regardless of their possible independent existence in an objective reality.

Religion and ethics

Devotio Moderna (1370s–1390s) 

Devotio Moderna, or Modern Devotion, was a movement for religious reform, calling for apostolic renewal through the rediscovery of genuine pious practices such as humility, obedience and simplicity of life. It began in the late fourteenth-century, largely through the work of Gerard Groote, and flourished in the Low Countries and Germany in the fifteenth century, but came to an end with the Protestant Reformation. Gerard Groote, father of the movement, founded the Brethren of the Common Life; after his death, disciples established a house of Augustinian Canons at Windesheim (near Zwolle, Overijssel). These two communities became the principal exponents of Devotio Moderna. Martin Luther studied under the Brethren of the Common Life at Magdeburg before going on to the University of Erfurt. Another famous member of the Brethren of the Common Life was Desiderius Erasmus of Rotterdam.

Devotio Moderna, an undogmatic form of piety which some historians have argued helped to pave the road for the Protestant Reformation, is most known today through its influence on Thomas à Kempis, the author of The Imitation of Christ a book which proved highly influential for centuries.

Mennonites (1536) 
The Mennonites are a Christian group based around the church communities of Anabaptist denominations named after Menno Simons (1496–1561) of Friesland. Through his writings, Simons articulated and formalized the teachings of earlier Swiss founders. The teachings of the Mennonites were founded on their belief in both the mission and Ministry of Jesus Christ, which they held to with great conviction despite persecution by various Roman Catholic and Protestant states.

Dutch Reformed Church (1571) 
The Dutch Reformed Church (in Dutch: Nederlandse Hervormde Kerk or NHK) was a Reformed Christian denomination. It developed during the Protestant Reformation, with its base in what became known as the Roman Catholic Church. It was founded in the 1570s and lasted until 2004, the year it merged with the Reformed Churches in the Netherlands and the Evangelical Lutheran Church in the Kingdom of the Netherlands to form the Protestant Church in the Netherlands.

Arminianism (1620) 
Arminianism is based on the theological ideas of Dutch Reformed theologian Jacobus Arminius (1560–1609) and his historic supporters known as the Remonstrants. His teachings held to the five solae of the Reformation, but they were distinct from the particular teachings of Martin Luther, Zwingli, John Calvin, and other Protestant Reformers. Arminius (Jacobus Hermanszoon) was a student of Beza (successor of Calvin) at the Theological University of Geneva.

Many Christian denominations have been influenced by Arminian views on the will of man being freed by grace prior to regeneration, notably the Baptists in the 16th century, the Methodists in the 18th century and the Seventh-day Adventist Church. John Wesley was influenced by Arminianism. Also, Arminianism was an important influence in Methodism, which developed out of the Wesleyan movement. Some assert that Universalists and Unitarians in the 18th and 19th centuries were theologically linked with Arminianism.

First synagogue to be established in the (Americas) New World (1636) 
The first synagogue of the New World, Kahal Zur Israel Synagogue, is founded in Recife, Brazil by the Dutch Jews. The Kahal Zur Israel Synagogue in Recife, Brazil, erected in 1636, was the first synagogue erected in the Americas. Its foundations have been recently discovered, and the 20th-century buildings on the site have been altered to resemble a 17th-century Dutch synagogue.

Jansenism (1640s) 
Jansenism was a Catholic theological movement, primarily in France, that emphasized original sin, human depravity, the necessity of divine grace, and predestination. The movement originated from the posthumously published work (Augustinus) of the Dutch theologian Cornelius Jansen, who died in 1638. It was first popularized by Jansen's friend Abbot Jean Duvergier de Hauranne, of Saint-Cyran-en-Brenne Abbey, and after Duvergier's death in 1643, was led by Antoine Arnauld. Through the 17th and into the 18th centuries, Jansenism was a distinct movement within the Catholic Church. The theological centre of the movement was the convent of Port-Royal Abbey, Paris, which was a haven for writers including Duvergier, Arnauld, Pierre Nicole, Blaise Pascal, and Jean Racine.

First Jewish congregation to be established in (the United States) North America (1654) 
Congregation Shearith Israel, the Spanish and Portuguese Synagogue in the City of New Amsterdam, was founded in 1654, the first Jewish congregation to be established in North America. Its founders were twenty-three Jews, mostly of Spanish and Portuguese origin, who had been living in Recife, Brazil. When the Portuguese defeated the Dutch for control of Recife, and brought with them the Inquisition, the Jews of that area left. Some returned to Amsterdam, where they had originated. Others went to places in the Caribbean such as St. Thomas, Jamaica, Surinam and Curaçao, where they founded sister Sephardic congregations. One group of twenty-three Jews, after a series of unexpected events, landed in New Amsterdam. After being initially rebuffed by anti-Semitic Governor Peter Stuyvesant, Jews were given official permission to settle in the colony in 1655. These pioneers fought for their rights and won permission to remain. This marks the founding of the Congregation Shearith Israel.

Scientific instruments

Telescope (optical telescope) (1608) 
The first historical records of a telescope appear in patents filed 1608 by Hans Lippershey and Jacob Metius. A description of Lippershey's instrument quickly reached Galileo Galilei, who created an improved version in 1609, with which he made the observations found in his Sidereus Nuncius of 1610.

Huygens eyepiece (1670s) 
Huygens eyepieces consist of two plano-convex lenses with the plane sides towards the eye separated by an air gap. The lenses are called the eye lens and the field lens. The focal plane is located between the two lenses. It was invented by Christiaan Huygens in the late 1660s and was the first compound (multi-lens) eyepiece. Huygens discovered that two air spaced lenses can be used to make an eyepiece with zero transverse chromatic aberration. These eyepieces work well with the very long focal length telescopes (in Huygens day they were used with single element long focal length non-achromatic refracting telescopes, including very long focal length aerial telescopes). This optical design is now considered obsolete since with today's shorter focal length telescopes the eyepiece suffers from short eye relief, high image distortion, chromatic aberration, and a very narrow apparent field of view. Since these eyepieces are cheap to make they can often be found on inexpensive telescopes and microscopes. Because Huygens eyepieces do not contain cement to hold the lens elements, telescope users sometimes use these eyepieces in the role of "solar projection", i.e. projecting an image of the Sun onto a screen. Other cemented eyepieces can be damaged by the intense, concentrated light of the Sun.

Microorganisms (1670s) 

Using an improved simple microscope, in 1673 Antonie van Leeuwenhoek becomes the first to discover, observe, describe, study and conduct scientific experiments with single-celled organisms, which he originally referred to as animalcules, and which now referred to as micro-organisms or microbes. For these observations he created at least 25 simple microscopes, of differing types, of which only nine survive. His simple microscopes were made of silver or copper frames, holding specially shaped single glass sphere that acted as a small lens. The smaller the sphere, the more it magnified. Those that have survived are capable of magnification up to 275 times. It is suspected that Van Leeuwenhoek possessed units that could magnify up to 500 times.

Cycloidal pendulum (1673) 
The cycloid pendulum was invented by Christiaan Huygens in 1673. Its purpose is to eliminate the lack of isochronism of the ordinary simple pendulum. This is achieved by making the mass point move on a cycloid instead of a circular arc.

Pyrometer (1739) 
The pyrometer, invented by Pieter van Musschenbroek, is a temperature measuring device. A simple type uses a thermocouple placed either in a furnace or on the item to be measured. The voltage output of the thermocouple is read from a meter. Many different types of thermocouple are available, for measuring temperatures from −200 °C to above 1500 °C.

Leyden jar (first practical capacitor) (1745–1746) 

A Leyden jar, or Leiden jar, is a device that "stores" static electricity between two electrodes on the inside and outside of a glass jar. It was the original form of a capacitor (originally known as a "condenser"). It was invented independently by German cleric Ewald Georg von Kleist on 11 October 1745 and by Dutch scientist Pieter van Musschenbroek of Leiden (Leyden) in 1745–1746. The invention was named for the city. The Leyden jar was used to conduct many early experiments in electricity, and its discovery was of fundamental importance in the study of electricity. Previously, researchers had to resort to insulated conductors of large dimensions to store a charge. The Leyden jar provided a much more compact alternative. Like many early electrical devices, there was no particular use for the Leyden jar at first, other than to allow scientists to do a greater variety of electrical experiments. Benjamin Franklin, for example, used a Leyden jar to store electricity from lightning in his famous kite experiment in 1752. By doing so he proved that lightning was really electricity.

The idea for the Leyden jar was discovered independently by two parties: German scientist and jurist Ewald Georg von Kleist, and Dutchmen Pieter van Musschenbroek and Andreas Cunaeus. These scientists developed the Leyden jar while working under a theory of electricity that saw electricity as a fluid, and hoped to develop the jar to "capture" this fluid. In 1744 von Kleist lined a glass jar with silver foil, and charged the foil with a friction machine. Kleist was convinced that a substantial electric charge could be collected when he received a significant shock from the device. The effects of this "Kleistian jar" were independently discovered around the same time by Dutch scientists Pieter van Musschenbroek and Cunaeus at the University of Leiden. Van Musschenbroek communicated on it with the French scientific community where it was called the Leyden jar.

Eisinga Planetarium (1781) 
The Eisinga Planetarium (Royal Eise Eisinga Planetarium) was built by Eise Eisinga in his home in Franeker, Friesland. It took Eisinga seven years to build his planetarium, completing it in 1781. The orrery still exists and is the world's oldest working planetarium.

Kipp's apparatus (1860) 
Kipp's apparatus, also called a Kipp generator, is designed for preparation of small volumes of gases. It was invented around 1860 by Dutch pharmacist Petrus Jacobus Kipp and widely used in chemical laboratories and for demonstrations in schools into the second half of the 20th century.

Phase contrast microscope (1933) 

In optical microscopy many objects such as cell parts in protozoans, bacteria and sperm tails are essentially fully transparent unless stained (and therefore killed). The difference in densities and composition within these objects however often gives rise to changes in the phase of light passing through them, hence they are sometimes called "phase objects". Using the phase-contrast technique makes these structures visible and allows the study of living specimens. This phase contrast technique proved to be such an advancement in microscopy that Dutch physicist Frits Zernike was awarded the Nobel Prize in 1953.

Magnetic horn (1961) 
The magnetic horn (also known as the Van der Meer horn) is a high-current, pulsed focusing device, invented by the Dutch physicist Simon van der Meer at CERN. It selects pions and focuses them into a sharp beam. Its original application was in the context of neutrino physics, where beams of pions have to be tightly focused. When the pions then decay into muons and neutrinos or antineutrinos, an equally well-focused neutrino beam is obtained. The muons were stopped in a wall of 3000 tons of iron and 1000 tons of concrete, leaving the neutrinos or antineutrinos to reach the Gargamelle bubble chamber.

Sports and games

Kolf (forerunner of modern golf) (13th century) 

A golf-like game (kolf in Dutch) is recorded as taking place on 26 February 1297, in a city called Loenen aan de Vecht, where the Dutch played a game with a stick and leather ball. The winner was whoever hit the ball with the fewest strokes into a target several hundred yards away. Some scholars argue that this game of putting a small ball in a hole in the ground using clubs was also played in 17th-century Netherlands and that this predates the game in Scotland.

Figure skating (prototype) (15th–17th centuries) 

The Dutch played a significant role in the history of ice skating (including speed skating and figure skating). The first feature of ice skating in a work of art was made in the 15th century. The picture, depicted Saint Lidwina, patron saint of ice skaters, falling on the ice. Another important aspect is a man seen in the background, who is skating on one leg. This means that his skates must have had sharp edges similar to those found on modern ice skates. Until the 17th century, ice skating was mostly used for transportation. Some of the Stuarts (including King Charles II of England) who had fled to the Dutch Republic during the Cromwell Royal reign later returned to Britain, bringing with them the new sport. Upon his return to England in 1658, the King brought two innovations in ice skating – a pair of iron skates and the Dutch roll. The Dutch roll was the first form of a gliding or skating motion made possible by the iron skate's two edges. However, speed skating was the focus of the Dutch, while the English developed modern figure skating.

Speed skating (15th–17th centuries) 

Speed skating, which had developed in the Netherlands in the 17th century, was given a boost by the innovations in skate construction. Speed skating, or speedskating, is a competitive form of skating in which skaters race each other over a certain distance. Types of speed skating are long track speed skating, short track speed skating and marathon speed skating. In the modern Olympic Games, long-track speed skating is usually referred to as just "speed skating", while short-track speed skating is known as "short track".

Yachting (sport sailing) (17th century) 
Sailing, also known as yachting, is a sport in which competitors race from point to point, or around a race course, in sail-powered boats. Yachting refers to recreational sailing or boating, the specific act of sailing or using other water vessels for sporting purposes. The invention of sailing is prehistoric, but the racing of sailing boats is believed to have started in the Netherlands some time in the 17th century. While living in the Dutch Republic, King Charles II of England fell in love with sailing and in 1660, took home the Dutch gifted 66-foot yacht he called Mary. The sport's popularity spread across the British Isles. The world's first yacht club was founded in Cork, Ireland in 1720.

International Skating Union (1892) 
The International Skating Union (ISU) is the international governing body for competitive ice skating disciplines, including figure skating, synchronized skating, speed skating, and short track speed skating. It was founded in Scheveningen, Netherlands, in 1892, making it the oldest governing international winter sport federation and one of the oldest international sport federations.

The first official World Championships in Speed Skating (open to men only) directly under the auspices of the ISU were held in Amsterdam in 1893.

Korfball (1902) 
Korfball (Korfbal in Dutch) is a mixed gender team sport, with similarities to netball and basketball. A team consists of eight players; four female and four male. A team also includes a coach. It was founded in the Netherlands in 1902 by Nico Broekhuysen.

Tiki-taka (1990s) 
FC Barcelona and the Spain national football team play a style of football known as Tiki-taka that has its roots in Total Football. Johan Cruyff founded Tiki-taka (commonly spelled tiqui-taca in Spanish) during his time as manager of FC Barcelona (1988–1996). The style was successfully adopted by the all-conquering Spain national football team (2008–2012) and Pep Guardiola's Barcelona team (2009–2011). Tiki-taka style differs from Total Football in that it focuses on ball movement rather than positional interchange.

Technology and engineering

First pound lock in Europe (1373) 

The Netherlands revived the construction of canals during the 13th–14th century that had generally been discontinued since the fall of the Roman Empire. They also contributed in the development of canal construction technology, such as introducing the first flash locks in Europe. The first pound lock in Europe was built by the Dutch in 1373 at Vreeswijk, where a canal from Utrecht joins the river Lek.

Thermostat (automatic temperature regulator) (1620s) 

Around the 1620s, Cornelis Drebbel developed an automatic temperature control system for a furnace, motivated by his belief that base metals could be turned to gold by holding them at a precise constant temperature for long periods of time. He also used this temperature regulator in an incubator for hatching chickens.

Feedback control system (1620s) 
Feedback control has been used for centuries to regulate engineered systems. In the 17th century, Drebbel invented one of the earliest devices to use feedback, a chicken incubator that used a damper controlled by a thermostat to maintain a constant temperature.

Magic lantern (1659) 

The magic lantern is an optical device, an early type of image projector developed in the 17th century. People have been projecting images using concave mirrors and pin-hole cameras (camera obscura) since Roman times. But glass lens technology was not sufficiently developed to make advanced optical devices (such as telescope and microscope) until the 17th century. With pinhole cameras and camera obscura it was only possible to project an image of actual scene, such as an image of the sun, on a surface. The magic lantern on the other hand could project a painted image on a surface, and marks the point where cameras and projectors became two different kinds of devices. There has been some debate about who the original inventor of the magic lantern is, but the most widely accepted theory is that Christiaan Huygens developed the original device in the late 1650s. However, other sources give credit to the German priest Athanasius Kircher. He describes a device such as the magic lantern in his book Ars Magna Lucis et Umbrae. Huygens is credited because of his major innovation in lantern technology, which was the replacement of images etched on mirrors from earlier lanterns such as Kircher's with images painted on glass. This is what paved the way for the use of colour and for double-layered slide projections (generally used to simulate movement).

Fire hose (1673) 
In Amsterdam, the Superintendent of the Fire Brigade, Jan van der Heyden, and his son Nicholaas took firefighting to its next step with the fashioning of the first fire hose in 1673.

Gunpowder enginem(1678–80) 
A gunpowder engine, also known as an explosion engine or Huygens' engine, is a type of internal combustion engine using gunpowder as its fuel. It was considered essentially as the first rudimentary internal combustion piston engine. The concept was first explored during the 17th century, most notably by the Dutch scientist Christiaan Huygens. In 1678 he outlined a gunpowder engine consisting of a vertical tube containing a piston. Gunpowder was inserted into the tube and lit through a small hole at the base, like a cannon. The expanding gasses would drive the piston up the tube until it reached a point near the top. Here, the piston uncovered holes in the tube that allowed any remaining hot gasses to escape. The weight of the piston and the vacuum formed by the cooling gasses in the now-closed cylinder drew the piston back into the tube, lifting a test mass to provide power. According to sources, a single example of this sort of engine was built in 1678 or 79 using a cannon as the cylinder. The cylinder was held down to a base where the gunpowder sat, making it a breech loading design. The gasses escaped via two leather tubes attached at the top of the barrel. When the piston reached them the gasses blew the tubes open, and when the pressure fell, gravity pulled the leather down causing the tubes droop to the side of the cylinder, sealing the holes. Huygens’ presented a paper on his invention in 1680, A New Motive Power by Means of Gunpowder and Air. By 1682, the device had successfully shown that a dram (1/16th of an ounce) of gunpowder, in a cylinder seven or eight feet high and fifteen or eighteen inches in diameter, could raise seven or eight boys (or about 1,100 pounds) into the air, who held the end of the rope.

Hollander beater (1680s) 
The Hollander beater is a machine developed by the Dutch in 1680 to produce pulp from cellulose-containing plant fibers. It replaced stamp mills for preparing pulp because the Hollander could produce in one day the same quantity of pulp that a stamp mill could produce in eight.

Gas lighting (1783) 
In 1783, Maastricht-born chemist Jan Pieter Minckelers used coal gas for lighting and developed the first form of gas lighting.

Meat slicer (1898) 
A meat slicer, also called a slicing machine, deli slicer or simply a slicer, is a tool used in butcher shops and delicatessens to slice meats and cheeses. The first meat slicer was invented by Wilhelm van Berkel (Wilhelmus Adrianus van Berkel) in Rotterdam in 1898. Older models of meat slicer may be operated by crank, while newer ones generally use an electric motor.

Pentode (1926) 
A pentode is an electronic device having five active electrodes. The term most commonly applies to a three-grid vacuum tube (thermionic valve), which was invented by the Dutchman Bernhard D.H. Tellegen in 1926.

Philishave (1939) 
Philishave was the brand name for electric shavers manufactured by the Philips Domestic Appliances and Personal Care unit of Philips (in the US, the Norelco name is used). The Philishave shaver was invented by Philips engineer Alexandre Horowitz, who used rotating cutters instead of the reciprocating cutters that had been used in previous electric shavers.

Gyrator (1948) 
A gyrator is a passive, linear, lossless, two-port electrical network element invented by Tellegen as a hypothetical fifth linear element after the resistor, capacitor, inductor and ideal transformer.

Traffic enforcement camera (1958) 
Dutch company Gatsometer BV, founded by the 1950s rally driver Maurice Gatsonides, invented the first traffic enforcement camera. Gatsonides wished to better monitor his speed around the corners of a race track and came up with the device in order to improve his time around the circuit. The company developed the first radar for use with road traffic and is the world's largest supplier of speed-monitoring camera systems. Because of this, in some countries speed cameras are sometimes referred to as "Gatsos". They are also sometimes referred to as "photo radar", even though many of them do not use radar.

The first systems introduced in the late 1960s used film cameras, replaced by digital cameras beginning in the late 1990s.

Variomatic (1958) 
Variomatic is the stepless, fully automatic transmission of the Dutch car manufacturer DAF, originally developed by Hub van Doorne. The Variomatic was introduced in 1958 (DAF 600), the first automatic gear box made in the Netherlands. It continues in use in motorscooters. Variomatic was the first commercially successful continuously variable transmissions (CVT).

Red light camera (1965) 
A Red light camera is a traffic enforcement camera that captures an image of a vehicle that enters an intersection against a red traffic light. By automatically photographing such vehicles, the camera produces evidence that assists authorities in their enforcement of traffic laws. The first red light camera system was introduced in 1965, using tubes stretched across the road to detect the violation and trigger the camera. One of the first developers of these red light camera systems was Dutch company Gatsometer BV.

Stochastic cooling (1968) 
Stochastic cooling is a form of particle beam cooling. It is used in some particle accelerators and storage rings to control the emission of particle beams. This process uses the electrical signals that the individual charged particles generate in a feedback loop to reduce the tendency of individual particles to move away from other particles in the beam. This technique was invented and applied at the Intersecting Storage Rings, and later the Super Proton Synchrotron, at CERN in Geneva, Switzerland by Dutch physicist Simon van der Meer. By increasing the particle density to close to the required energy, this technique improved the beam quality and, inter alia, brought the discovery of W and Z bosons within reach.

Clap skate (1980) 
The clap skate (also called clapskates, slap skates, slapskates) is a type of ice skate used in speed skating. Clap skates were developed at the Faculty of Human Movement Sciences of the Vrije Universiteit of Amsterdam, led by Gerrit Jan van Ingen Schenau, although the idea is much older. van Ingen Schenau, who started work on a hinged speed skate in 1979, created his first prototype in 1980 and finished his PhD thesis on the subject in 1981 using the premise that a skater would benefit from extended movement keeping the blade on the ice, allowing the calf muscles more time to exert force.

Cremulator (1981) 
The Cremulator is a machine developed by the Dutch company ALL Europe in 1981. The Cremulator is used after cremation, about 3 kg of ashes remain on average. These ash residues are reduced in a cremulator for subsequent scattering or in an urn. Also called asmill. The Cremulator is now further developed by DFW Europe as cremation equipment manufacturer in The Netherlands.

Transportation

Ice skate improvements (14th–15th centuries) 

In the 14th century, the Dutch started using wooden platform skates with flat iron bottom runners. The skates were attached to the skater's shoes with leather straps and poles were used to propel the skater. Around 1500, the Dutch shifted to a narrow metal double edged blade, so the skater could now push and glide with his feet, eliminating the need for a pole.

Herring Buss (15th century) 
A herring buss was a type of seagoing fishing vessel, used by Dutch and Flemish herring fishermen in the 15th through early 19th centuries. The Buis was first adapted for use as a fishing vessel in the Netherlands, after the invention of gibbing made it possible to preserve herring at sea. This made longer voyages feasible, and hence enabled Dutch fishermen to follow the herring shoals far from the coasts. The first herring buss was probably built in Hoorn around 1415. The last one was built in Vlaardingen in 1841.

Yacht (1580s) 

Originally defined as a light, fast sailing vessel used by the Dutch navy to pursue pirates and other transgressors around and into the shallow waters of the Low Countries. Later, yachts came to be perceived as luxury, or recreational vessels.

Fluyt (16th century) 

Fluyt, a type of sailing vessel originally designed as a dedicated cargo vessel. Originating from the Netherlands in the 16th century, the vessel was designed to facilitate transoceanic delivery with the maximum of space and crew efficiency. The inexpensive ship could be built in large numbers. This ship class was credited with enhancing Dutch competitiveness in international trade and was widely employed by the Dutch East India Company in the 17th and 18th centuries. The fluyt was a significant factor in the 17th century rise of the Dutch seaborne empire.

Wind-powered sawmill (1592) 

Cornelis Corneliszoon was the inventor of the wind-powered sawmill. Prior to the invention of sawmills, boards were rived and planed, or more often sawn by two men with a whipsaw using saddleblocks to hold the log and a pit for the pitman who worked below and got the benefit of sawdust in his eyes. Sawing was slow and required strong and durable sawmen. The topsawer had to be the stronger of the two because the saw was pulled in turn by each man, and the lower had the advantage of gravity. The topsawyer also had to guide the saw to produce a plank of even thickness. This was often done by following a chalkline.

Early sawmills adapted the whipsaw to mechanical power, generally driven by a water wheel to speed up the process. The circular motion of the wheel was changed to back-and-forth motion of the saw blade by a pitman thus introducing a term used in many mechanical applications. A pitman is similar to a crankshaft used in reverse. A crankshaft converts back-and-forth motion to circular motion.

Generally only the saw was powered and the logs had to be loaded and moved by hand. An early improvement was the development of a movable carriage, also water powered, to steadily advance the log through the saw blade.

Schooner (prototype) (17th century) 
A schooner is a type of sailing vessel with fore-and-aft sails on two or more masts, the foremast being no taller than the rear mast(s). Such vessels were first used by the Dutch in the 16th or 17th century (but may not have been called that at the time). Schooners first evolved from a variety of small two-masted gaff-rigged vessels used in the coast and estuaries of the Netherlands in the late 17th century. Most were working craft but some pleasure yachts with schooner rigs were built for wealthy merchants and Dutch nobility. Following arrival of the Dutch-born prince William III the Orange on the British throne, the British Royal Navy built a Royal yacht with a schooner rig in 1695, HMS Royal Transport. This vessel, captured in a detailed Admiralty model, is the earliest fully documented schooner. Royal Transport was quickly noted for its speed and ease of handling and mercantile vessels soon adopted the rig in Europe and in European colonies in North America. Schooners were immediately popular with colonial traders and fishermen in North America with the first documented reference to a schooner in America appearing in Boston port records in 1716. North American shipbuilders quickly developed a variety of schooner forms for trading, fishing and privateering. According to the language scholar Walter William Skeat, the term schooner comes from scoon, while the sch spelling comes from the later adoption of the Dutch spelling ("schoener"). Another study suggests that a Dutch expression praising ornate schooner yachts in the 17th century, "een schoone Schip", may have led to the term "schooner" being used by English speakers to describe the early versions of the schooner rig as it evolved in England and America.

Land yacht (1600) 

The Wind chariot or land yacht (Zeilwagen) was designed by Flemish-born mathematician & engineer Simon Stevin for Prince Maurice of Orange. Land yacht. It offered a carriage with sails, of which a little model was preserved in Scheveningen until 2012. Around the year 1600, Stevin, Maurice and twenty-six others used it on the beach between Scheveningen and Petten. The carriage was propelled solely by force of wind, and traveled faster than horse-drawn vehicles.

First verified practical (navigable) submarine (1620) 

A replica of reduced scale of Drebbel's submarine built by the team of the TV-series "Building the Impossible" (2002).
Cornelius Drebbel was the inventor of the first navigable submarine, while working for the British Royal Navy. He designed and manufactured a steerable submarine with a leather-covered wooden frame. Between 1620 and 1624 Drebbel successfully built and tested two more, successively larger vessels. The third model had 6 oars and could carry 16 passengers. This model was demonstrated to King James I and several thousand Londoners. This submarine was tested many times in the Thames, but never used in battle.

In 2002, the British boatbuilder Mark Edwards built a wooden submarine based on the original 17th-century version by Drebbel. This was shown in the BBC TV programme Building the Impossible in November 2002. It is a scale working model of the original and was built using tools and construction methods common in 17th century boat building and was successfully tested under water with two rowers at Dorney Lake, diving beneath the surface and being rowed underwater for 10 minutes. Legal considerations prevented its use on the River Thames itself.

First ever car equipped with a six-cylinder engine, along with four-wheel drive (1903) 

Spyker is credited with building and racing the first ever four-wheel racing car in 1903. The first four-wheel-drive car, as well as hill-climb racer, with internal combustion engine, the Spyker 60 H.P., was presented in 1903 by Dutch brothers Jacobus and Hendrik-Jan Spijker of Amsterdam. The two-seat sports car, which was also the first ever car equipped with a six-cylinder engine, is now an exhibit in the Louwman Collection (the former Nationaal Automobiel Museum) at the Hague in The Netherlands.

Notes

References

External links 
 Daily Dutch Innovation

.
Lists of inventions or discoveries
Inventions and discoveries
.
Science and technology in the Dutch Republic
Science and technology in the Netherlands
Dutch exploration in the Age of Discovery
Expeditions from the Netherlands
List of Dutch inventions